Diomus pumilio is a species of ladybird. Its common name is Longblack Ladybird. It is found in North America, Oceania and Australia.

References

Coccinellidae
Beetles described in 1885